Bir Bahadur Ushwe Sing is a Bangladesh Awami League politician and the minister of Chittagong Hill Tracts affairs since 2019. He is from Bandarban district and was elected as a member of parliament , from the constituency 300. Bandarban for the 6th time in the 11th parliamentary election. He has also served as the State Minister of the Ministry of Chittagong Hill Tracts(2014-2018).

Early life and education 
Bir Bahadur Ushwe Sing was born on 10 January 1960. He completed his  H. S. C. from Chittagong College also is an alumnus of Rajshahi University.

References

Living people
Awami League politicians
State Ministers of Chittagong Hill Tracts Affairs
11th Jatiya Sangsad members
9th Jatiya Sangsad members
10th Jatiya Sangsad members
1960 births
Bangladeshi Buddhists